Crush the Cenotaph is an EP by Asphyx. It was released in 1992 by Century Media Records.

Track listing

Tracks 1, 2 and 3 were recorded at Woodhouse Studio, Dortmund, 1991.
Tracks 4 and 5 were recorded live on November 30, 1991, in Stockholm, Sweden.

Personnel
 Martin van Drunen - vocals, bass guitar
 Eric Daniels - guitar
 Bob Bagchus - drums

References

Asphyx albums
1992 EPs
Century Media Records EPs
Albums produced by Waldemar Sorychta